Kuala Lumpur Inner Ring Road is an urban and municipal ring road system of Kuala Lumpur consisting of Jalan Sultan Ismail (Jalan Treacher), Jalan Imbi, Jalan Shaw and Federal Route 1 (Jalan Kuching, Jalan Sultan Hisamuddin (Victory Avenue), Jalan Kinabalu and Jalan Maharajalela (Jalan Birch)). Kuala Lumpur's district of shopping complexes, the Golden Triangle, is located within the ring road.

Features
Jalan Kinabalu Flyover was the first flyover in Malaysia built since independence. It was opened in August 1965.
Overhead monorail track along Jalan Sultan Ismail, Jalan Imbi and Jalan Hang Tuah.

Developments

Edinburgh flyover
Construction began in late 2007 and was completed in the end of 2009. The project is led by the Kuala Lumpur City Hall (Dewan Bandaraya Kuala Lumpur (DBKL)).

Jalan Pudu-Hang Tuah intersections
The 114-year-old Pudu Prison's wall between Jalan Pudu and Jalan Hang Tuah was demolished on 20 June 2010 by the Kuala Lumpur City Hall (Dewan Bandaraya Kuala Lumpur (DBKL)) to make way for a road expansion and tunnel project on Jalan Pudu. In February 2022 it got replaced to Bukit Bintang City Centre.

Section between Raja Chulan and Imbi
The section of the Inner Ring Road between Raja Chulan and Imbi intersections was changed to one-way road in 2007 because of the opening of the SMART Tunnel and the Sultan Ismail–Kampung Pandan Link. As a result, motorists travelling in clockwise direction are diverted to Jalan Raja Chulan and Jalan Imbi. However, the road divider along the section remained intact to retain the support of the overhead KL Monorail tracks. As a result, motorists travelling at the wrong side of the road may tend to cross illegally to the other carriageway, exposing them to risks of accidents.

Lists of junctions and interchanges

See also
 Kuala Lumpur Middle Ring Road 2
 Jalan Tuanku Abdul Halim

Ring roads in Malaysia
Highways in Malaysia
Expressways and highways in the Klang Valley
Roads in Kuala Lumpur